The Mikoyan-Gurevich MiG-6 was a Soviet ground-attack aircraft design of World War II.

When founding the OKB Mikoyan-Gurevich, Artem Mikoyan and Mikhail Gurevich used two basic designs from their former employer Polikarpov. One was finally developed to the Mikoyan-Gurevich MiG-1. The other was the project 65. They worked on this project to get a so-called TSch (Tjaschely Schturmowik) as a competitor model to the Ilyushin Il-2. Only the paperwork was done. A parallel development was done by Sukhoi, leading to the Sukhoi Su-6.

Sources 

 German Book: Karl-Heinz Eyermann MiG-Flugzeuge
 German article in FliegerRevue: Memoires of Gurevich
 Vaclav Nemecek: Soviet Planes; German translation(ca.1999) Luftfahrtverlag Walter Ziehrl

1940s Soviet attack aircraft
MiG-006
Abandoned military aircraft projects of the Soviet Union